The Most Esteemed Royal Family Order of Selangor (Malay: Darjah Kerabat Selangor Yang Amat Dihormati) is an order awarded by Sultan of Selangor to members of the Selangor and other Royal families, and to high officers of state. It is the highest award that can be represented in Selangor. The First Class order was founded in 1961 while the Second Class in 1977.

Criteria 
The Darjah Kerabat Selangor Yang Amat Dihormati is awarded in two classes.

The First Class is awarded to the member of Royal Family in Malaysia. In addition, it is also awarded to the rulers of other countries as a sign of respect and friendship with the Sultan. The maximum number of recipient at one time is 25 people.

The Second Class is awarded to the member of Royal Family in Malaysia. It was also awarded as a tribute to the Princes and Princesses of the King of the Foreign Countries as a sign of respect and fellowship with the Sultan. High officers who have contributed excellent services to the Sultan or the Selangor State Government are also eligible to receive this award.

Appearance

First Class 
It is awarded in a set of breast star, a collar with a lesser star, a yellow coloured sash with red stripe, worn from the left shoulder to the right waist and a lesser star for the sash.

The collar is made of 101.6 cm long gold-plated metal which is worn on the same length at the front and back, containing 14 chain link joints. The two links in the middle have the engraving of the symbol of Selangor state on a crescent moon. Other links are ovoid in shape. The engraving on the links consist of two crossed keris blades, alternating with a crescent moon, surrounded by coconut leaves.

The collar's star has five points. It is made of gold-plated metal. Its surface is lined up with gems. In the middle of the star is a crown and a Selangor state symbol, with thin red enamel as its based. It is surrounded by coconut leaves.

The badge is made up of a five pointed star. The badge is 7.62 cm and made of gold-plated metal. The crown and Selangor state symbol are engraved in the center. The base is made of shadowed thin red enamel and decorated with coconut leaves engravings. This badge is attached on top of a silver-plated ten-pointed star.

Second Class 
It is awarded in a set of breast star, a collar with a lesser star, a yellow coloured sash with two red stripes in the middle, worn from the left shoulder to the right waist and a lesser star for the sash.

The collar is made of gold-plated metal and contains 14 chain links. The Selangor state emblem on a crescent moon is engraved on the center link. The other links are round in shape. Engraved on its surface are a keris cross, alternating with a chain bearing the word of Allah in Jawi letters. The collar's star is gold in colour. The surface is engraved with a composition of coconut leaves.

The badge is golden enamel in colour and has red enamel coconut leaves engravings.

The sash is made up of 101.6mm wide silk. It is yellow in colour with two red stripes.

Recipients

See also 
Orders, decorations, and medals of the Malaysian states and federal territories#Selangor
List of post-nominal letters (Selangor)

References 

 
Orders, decorations, and medals of Selangor
Selangor